The Damnée River (in French: rivière Damnée) flows entirely in the municipality of Saint-Damase-de-L'Islet, in the L'Islet Regional County Municipality, in the administrative region of Chaudière-Appalaches, in the province of Quebec, in Canada.

The Damnée river is a tributary of the Ouelle River which flows northeast and empties into the municipality of Rivière-Ouelle, on the south shore of the St. Lawrence River.

Geography 
The Damnée river takes its source from streams descending the eastern slope of Mont Fournier which is located in the municipality of Saint-Damase-de-L'Islet, very close to the limit of the municipality of Saint-Aubert, in the heart of Notre Dame Mountains.

  heading northeast through Saint-Damase-de-L'Islet, to route 204;
  northeasterly, to the outlet of Lac Boucher;
  to the northeast;
  towards the northeast, until its confluence.

Toponymy 
The toponym Damnée river was formalized on December 5, 1968, by the Commission de toponymie du Québec.

See also

 List of rivers of Quebec

References 

Rivers of Chaudière-Appalaches
L'Islet Regional County Municipality